Macbeth is a silent Italian 1909 film adaptation of the William Shakespeare play Macbeth.  It was the second Macbeth film released that year (released on 27 November 1909), and is the third film version of the play. The film was directed by Mario Caserini, and starred Dante Cappelli, Maria Caserini, Amleto Palormi, and Ettore Pesci.  The running time is 16 minutes and it is a black-and-white film.

Main cast
Dante Cappelli as Macbeth
Maria Caserini as Lady Macbeth
Amleto Palormi		
Ettore Pesci

References

Films based on Macbeth
1909 films
Italian historical drama films
Italian silent short films
Italian black-and-white films
1900s historical drama films
Films set in Scotland
Films directed by Mario Caserini
Silent drama films